Malxe (Lower Sorbian Małksa) is a river in Brandenburg, Germany. Due to open pit lignite mining, its upper course and lower course have been separated. The upper course, which is also referred to as Malxe-Neiße-Kanal, leads from Döbern along Forst (Lausitz) to Briesnig, where it discharges into the Lusatian Neisse. The Malxe proper, the former lower course, starts at the western edge of the Jänschwalde open pit mine, in Heinersbrück, and flows through Peitz to Schmogrow-Fehrow, where it joins the Hammergraben, forming the Großes Fließ.

See also
List of rivers of Brandenburg

Rivers of Brandenburg
Rivers of Germany